Blue Light was an American counter-terrorist subunit of the 5th Special Forces Group that existed into the late 1970s. 

According to Col. Charles Beckwith's memoirs, this counter-terrorist group was formed by U.S. Army Special Forces leadership to fill an important counter-terrorism gap until Delta Force became operational. He stated that the unit was disbanded when Delta Force went operational.

History
Beckwith's memoir, Delta Force, reports that commanders of the 5th Special Forces Group were asked by top brass of the Pentagon to quickly organize a counter-terrorist unit to fill in until Delta Force was fully operational; Beckwith estimated it would take two years. Blue Light and Delta had a somewhat adversarial relationship for those two years. The traditional Special Forces leadership felt that they could handle counter-terrorist duties within the Special Forces community (with Blue Light). Delta existed outside of that bureaucracy, with a direct line to top US Department of Defense (DOD) brass and the President. Delta therefore represented a political threat in the minds of some Special Forces commanders. 

Blue Light's S-2 (intelligence officer), captain Timothy J. Casey, was later one of the intelligence officers assigned to JTF 1–79 which commanded the ill-fated Operation Eagle Claw.

BL had recruited from soldiers who participated in the raid on Son Tay or from those who served in Vietnam in various special forces assignments. The unit recruited a female soldier named Katie Bradford, who served as an intelligence analyst, although she's been trained to handle combat missions when needed.

The unit was based at Mott Lake. Some experienced SOF officers visited Mott Lake from overseas to provide assistance and advice.

Nevertheless, Delta went on to complete its initial certification exercise in July 1978, and Blue Light was deactivated shortly thereafter. Blue Light members were asked to try out for Delta. At least four successfully passed selection and training.

Origin of name
Blue Light may have been a randomly generated code name, or may be a reference to American radar officer's slang, in which "to bluelight" can reportedly be used as a verb, meaning "to detect a contact with radar," thus metaphorically suggesting the ability to discover the enemy's hiding place. 

Founding member Gary O'Neal postulated in his book, American Warrior, that Robert Anthony Mountel used the name because it was the name of an undercover OSS mission in France during World War II.

Pop culture
In the 1990 film Die Hard 2, a U.S. Army Special Forces counter-terrorist response unit, referred to as "Blue Light", is called in when presumed terrorists seize Washington Dulles International Airport.

References

Special operations units and formations of the United States Army
Military counterterrorist organizations
Ad hoc units and formations of the United States Army
1978 disestablishments in the United States